The obsolete German legal concept Kranzgeld (literally "wreath money") is heart balm (see breach of promise) rewarded as compensation to a woman of "immaculate reputation" if a man broke off his engagement (or caused it to be broken off e.g. through infidelity) after having had sexual intercourse with her. Immaculate reputation in this context meant mainly virginity, but could also be lost through other factors such as being convicted of a crime.

The loss of virginity, it was assumed, would diminish the woman's expectations to gain a good match for a husband. Thus, the money is a form of legal damages.

The term refers to the wreath that a bride traditionally wears at her wedding. In some European cultures, notably Germany, a virgin bride was entitled to wear a wreath of myrtle flowers; a non-virgin bride, on the other hand, had to wear a wreath made of straw.

In Germany, Kranzgeld was regulated in paragraph §1300 of the family law, part of the civil code Bürgerliches Gesetzbuch published in 1896 and taking effect in 1900. After being long considered irrelevant, it was finally abolished on May 4, 1998, when the entire law was renewed, on the occasion of a trial in 1993 where the judges decided the law was outdated. A woman had then tried to sue for 1000 DM (in 2004, roughly €500 or $500), but the request was denied on the grounds of equal rights between man and woman.

See also
 Seduction (tort)
 Breach of promise

References

Family law
History of human sexuality
Repealed German legislation
Sex and the law